The Ottawa Police Service (OPS; French: Service de police d'Ottawa) is a municipal police force in Ottawa, Ontario, Canada. The OPS serves an area of 2,790 square kilometres and 1,017,449 (2021 census) people alongside several other police forces which have specialized jurisdiction.

History
The OPS' roots come from the formation of the "Bytown Association" in 1847. In 1855 Roderick Ross was the first chief constable for the newly-formed City of Ottawa. Over time, neighbouring municipalities also formed their own police forces, including Eastview in 1913 (which became the Vanier Police in 1963) and Gloucester-Nepean in 1957 (in 1964, this service split into separate Nepean and Gloucester forces).  As a precursor to future amalgamations, the Vanier Police were absorbed by the Ottawa Police in 1984.

In 1995, the Ottawa, Nepean and Gloucester police forces amalgamated to form the Ottawa-Carleton Regional Police Service.  The service area of the new force was extended to those portions of Ottawa-Carleton that had previously been policed by the Ontario Provincial Police.

The service was given its current name in 2001, to reflect the amalgamation of Ottawa-Carleton's constituent municipalities into the new City of Ottawa.

Over the course of Ottawa's history, the police forces have had 14 officers killed in the line of duty.

Policing Philosophy 
According to the OPS, they take a community oriented approach to policing. This can be demonstrated through numerous sections within the OPS. Firstly, the Neighbourhood Resource Team program (NRT) was created to deploy frontline constables into high crime and high traffic areas. NRT constables have created a noticeable difference in the downtown dynamic. After the closure of the OPS school resource officer program, NRT gained a new youth subdivision. The NRT youth division is meant to engage with at-risk youth outside of the education system. Secondly, the PIVOT team works to combat guns and gangs within Ottawa through a strategic deployment to certain communities. 

The Ottawa Police hiring process is longer than most services in Canada. An onboarding process can take up to 18 months to complete- this is even before training. Frontline OPS constables are expected to prioritize community interaction, which is a different approach from traditional law enforcement.

Community policing is displayed in many OPS units. Frontline and NRT constables are expected to make connections with citizens and businesses in the areas they serve. This in turn, creates a more trusting environment all-around.

The OPS was the first police service in Canada to include a Hate Crimes investigative branch.

Organization
The interim chief of police is deputy chief Steve Bell.

On Friday, October 21st, 2022, Ottawa Police Service Board Chair announced RCMP Assistant Commissioner Eric Stubbs would become Ottawa’s next Chief of Police effective November 17th, 2022.

The rank of senior constable is no longer awarded, however the rank is still in effect until the last senior constable retires. To have become a senior constable, an officer had to have had ten years service and have successfully completed the sergeant's promotional exam.

With very rare exceptions, all police officers receive their three-month police training and basic constables diplomas at the Ontario Police College, located in Aylmer, Ontario.

New police recruits are hired as 4th class constables, and without any training or discipline issues, can expect to reach the rank of 1st class constable within three years.  A 1st class constable has a base salary pretax of approximately $96,000, not including overtime and off-duty court time.  This pay rate is the norm compared to other police services found within Ontario and generally the Ottawa Police Service falls within the top five highest paid services in the province.

The OPS also maintains a Ceremonial Guard to attend the many community events and parades that occur in Ottawa as a representative of the police service, and the Ottawa Police Service Pipe Band, which competes every season in the Ontario pipe band circuit, most notably finishing as Ontario Championship Supreme in grade 2 in 2012.

Inter-agency relationships
Security services at Parliament Hill and the parliamentary district in Ottawa are handled by the Parliamentary Protective Service (PPS) and Royal Canadian Mounted Police (RCMP), not the OPS. The RCMP generally do not play a role in municipal police operations in Ottawa, with the exception of federal land managed by the National Capital Commission. Under federal and provincial law, the RCMP have jurisdiction over the entire city but maintain a mandate of diplomatic engagements, federal land, and the carriage rides.

The Ontario Provincial Police patrol Ottawa's main provincial highways (Highway 416 and the Queensway).

The Canadian Forces deploy their own military police to patrol Department of National Defence property in Ottawa (National Defence Headquarters (Canada), NDHQ Carling, CFS Leitrim and Connaught Cadet Training Centre).

The OPS provides law enforcement services at Ottawa Macdonald–Cartier International Airport and is also authorized to act on behalf of Ottawa Macdonald–Cartier International Airport Authority to provide certain security services. Before the 1997 semi-privatization of Class 1 Canadian airports, these services were provided by the RCMP to Transport Canada.

In April 2007, the Ottawa Police Services Board granted special constable status to transit law enforcement officers employed by OC Transpo. The OPS works in partnership with transit special constables who provide many frontline supplemental police services in cooperation with the Ottawa Police.

In the same way, some of the safety personnel of Carleton University are sworn as special constables and hold limited police powers on campus grounds.

Operations
The OPS has five police stations and 19 community policing centres.

Patrol operations
East division
Central division
West division

Criminal investigative services
Homicide Unit
Arson Unit
Sexual assault and child abuse section
Partner assault section
Organized auto theft
Guns and gangs unit
Fraud section
Elder abuse section
General investigative services
Break and enter response
Victim crisis unit
Direct action response team (DART)
Street crime unit
Diversity, race and relations unit
Internet child exploitation unit (ICE)
Drug unit
Forensic identification section
Human Trafficking and Offender Management (Human Trafficking, Missing Persons, Sex Offender Registry, Dangerous/Long Term Offender, Threat Evaluation and Offender Management, Major Case Management/ViClas)

Support services
911 communications
Court security and temporary custody: this section is responsible for prisoner security. The unit is staffed with police officers and special constables. Special constables are sworn-in pursuant to section 53 of Police Services Act which confers peace officer status. Special constables have the powers of a police officer when in the execution of their duties.
Victim services
Telephone response unit: call takers for minor crimes with no investigative leads
Imaging services unit

Emergency operations

Tactical unit
Canine section
Traffic escort
Emergency services unit
Marine unit
Underwater search and recovery unit
Collision investigation unit
Airport policing section (protective policing services) at Ottawa Macdonald–Cartier International Airport

Corporate services
Media relations
Quartermaster
Planning, performance and analytics
Community development
Diversity and race relations

Executive services
Professional standards section
Corporate communications

Fleet

Throughout the 20th century, the Ottawa Police Service and other neighbouring police services used a variety of vehicles, such as the Chevrolet Caprice.By the 2001 amalgamation, the majority of marked patrol vehicles deployed by the OPS were the Ford Crown Victoria Police Interceptor (CVPI) and Chevrolet Impala 9C1. Following the CVPI's discontinuation in 2011, the OPS purchased Ford Police Interceptor Sedan (FPIS) and Ford Police Interceptor Utility (FPIU) vehicles to replace it. The FPIS became the new majority of marked patrol vehicles in the fleet, especially after the Chevrolet Impala 9C1's discontinuation in 2016, until it was discontinued in 2019; since then, most FPIS vehicles in the fleet have been retired and replaced by newer FPIUs.

In February 2021, the Ottawa Police Services Board discussed the possibility of using electric police cars. In summer 2022, the OPS tested Dodge Durango and Dodge Charger police vehicles.

Vehicles used by the tactical unit include the Ford Expedition and the Lenco BearCat.

The OPS has one fixed wing aircraft, a Cessna 206 and various marine vehicles that patrol Ottawa waterways in the summer.

Replacement of marked general patrol vehicles

Ottawa Police fleet:

Equipment
 Glock 22 pistols
 Colt Canada C7 rifles and C8 carbines
 Remington 870 
 Mossberg 500 shotguns,
  Taser X26, 
 Taser X2, 
 Taser 7, 
 batons, 
 OC Spray (pepper spray), 
 Handcuffs, 
 Tourniquets,
 Radios,
 Many divisions within OPS carry tasers including the tactical unit, PIVOT, as well as most front line patrol officers. 
 Most marked Ottawa Police patrol vehicles are also equipped with automated external defibrillators in the trunk of their car.
 With an increase of overdoses in Ottawa, all OPS units carry Nalaxone (NARCAN).

Controversies

In June 2020, Chief Peter Sloly announced that Const. James Ramsay had been charged for creating a racist meme depicting racialized members of the Ottawa Police Service. The meme was a photo collage depicting 13 officers, most of whom were men of colour, and included the phrase "Ottawa Police Services – We're always hiring…anyone." The meme had circulated widely among the Ottawa Police Service before coming to the attention of Sloly. In late April, Sloly stated in a virtual meeting with the Ottawa Police services board that the meme targeted racialized members of the service. "It is an overt act of racism and it is unacceptable... This is more evidence of the need for a serious overhaul of our culture, ethics and ethical behaviour. The culture of the Ottawa Police Service needs significant improvement. We can no longer ignore this reality." Rasmay was temporarily demoted from first class to second class constable for 9 months as well as required participation in healing circle.

In September 2020, Ontario Court Justice Peter K. Doody found that the Ottawa Police Service had "a pattern of systemic failure" towards respecting the right to counsel guaranteed by Section 10 of the Charter of Rights and Freedoms after a defense lawyer presented him with 15 cases over the previous three years – not including the case in question and a subsequently reported case – of the OPS failing to advise detainees of that right.

In February 2022, Sloly resigned from the Ottawa Police Service amid controversy over his failure to disperse defiant anti-COVID-19 restriction protestors, which resulted in the Ottawa Police Service becoming managed by both the Mounties and the Ontario Provincial Police setting up a command centre in Ottawa to work with the local police. On February 16, 2022, Steve Bell, who has served as OPS Deputy Chief since 2016, was named as the interim Police Chief.

See also

Ottawa By-law Services

References

External links

Ottawa Police Service website
Ottawa Police Services Board

1855 establishments in Canada
Organizations established in 1855
Law enforcement agencies of Ontario
Municipal government of Ottawa